The 1999 Dubai World Cup was a horse race held at Nad Al Sheba Racecourse on Sunday 28 March 1999. It was the 4th running of the Dubai World Cup.

The winner was Hamdan Al Maktoum's Almutawakel, a four-year-old bay colt trained in Dubai by Saeed bin Suroor and ridden by Richard Hills. Almutawakel's victory was the first in the race for his owner, trainer and jockey.

Almutawakel had been campaigned on turf in Europe in 1997 and 1998, recording his most important success Prix Jean Prat at Chantilly Racecourse in May 1998. The 1999 Dubai World Cup attracted a strong field including Silver Charm (the previous year's winner) and Victory Gallop from North America, while the Godolphin stable were represented by Daylami and High-Rise. Racing on dirt for the first time Almutawakel took the lead in the straight and won by three-quarters of a length from Malek with Victory Gallop three-quarters of a length away in third.

Race details
 Sponsor: none
 Purse: £3,012,048; First prize: £1,807,229
 Surface: Dirt
 Going: Fast
 Distance: 10 furlongs
 Number of runners: 8
 Winner's time: 2:00.65

Full result

 Abbreviations: DSQ = disqualified; nse = nose; nk = neck; shd = head; hd = head; nk = neck; dist = distance

Winner's details
Further details of the winner, Alutawakel
 Sex: Colt
 Foaled: 19 January 1995
 Country: Great Britain
 Sire: Machiavellian; Dam: Elfaslah (Green Desert)
 Owner: Hamdan Al Maktoum
 Breeder: Shadwell Stud

References

Dubai World Cup
Dubai World Cup
Dubai World Cup
Dubai World Cup